Airspeed Limited was established in 1931 to build aeroplanes in York, England, by A. H. Tiltman and Nevil Shute Norway (the aeronautical engineer and novelist, who used his forenames as his pen-name). The other directors were A. E. Hewitt, Lord Grimthorpe and Alan Cobham. Amy Johnson was also one of the initial subscribers for shares.

Foundation
Airspeed Ltd. was founded by Nevil Shute Norway (later to become a novelist as Nevil Shute) and designer Hessell Tiltman. In his autobiography, Slide Rule: Autobiography of an Engineer, Norway gives an account of the founding of the company and of the processes that led to the development and mass production of the Oxford. He received the Fellowship of the Royal Aeronautical Society for his innovative fitting of a retractable undercarriage to aircraft.

Early operations
The AS.1 Tern, the first British high-performance glider (sailplane), was built to get publicity, and attract more capital, by setting British gliding records. A glider was able to fly in two or three months while the design office and workshop was being set up in half of an empty bus garage, on Piccadilly in York. Shute himself was the pilot on the Tern's first test flight.

In 1932, Airspeed produced the AS.4 Ferry, a three-engined, ten-passenger biplane designed specifically for Sir Alan Cobham.

In March 1933, the firm moved to Portsmouth where the City Council gave generous terms for a factory building constructed to Airspeed's requirements at the local airport. The first Airspeed Courier was flown from there in 1933, followed by the first of a twin-engined development of the Courier, the Airspeed Envoy, in 1934. Both the Courier and the Envoy were made in small numbers. In the same year, a long-range racing version of the Envoy, the AS.8 Viceroy, was developed for the England-Australia MacRobertson Air Race.

In August 1934, Airspeed (1934) Limited made a public issue of shares, in association with the Tyneside ship builder Swan Hunter & Wigham Richardson Limited.

In 1934, six Couriers had been sold to an operating company for a hire purchase deposit of £5 each. Managing director, Nevil Shute, wrote that they could come back to Airspeed and as an "obsolescent type" might not be so easy to sell again. He got a reputation as "unscrupulous" for resisting the auditors' attempt to write them down on the books because, with growing talk of war, civil aircraft of any size would "sell immediately". As the six were worth nearly twenty thousand pounds, writing them down to half that would add £10,000 to their loss, making the firm's proposed share issue a very unattractive investment. Shute could see from his office the four hundred workers in the "shop" with families depending on their jobs. In 1936, most of the unsold Couriers and Envoys were sold and found their way to the Spanish Civil War. The demonstration Envoy was sold to the Spanish Nationalists for £6000, paid for in cash (six £1000 Bank of England notes). In 1935, the sole Airspeed Viceroy was nearly sold to Ethiopia for use against Italian forces.

In 1934, Shute negotiated with Anthony Fokker for a licensing agreement with Fokker. Shute found Fokker to be "genial, shrewd and helpful" but "already a sick man", and difficult to deal with because "his domestic life was irregular". Fokker worked "at all hours and in strange places". Frequently "his very efficient legal advisor and secretary could not tell us where he was". In 1935, Airspeed signed a manufacturing licensing agreement for the Douglas DC-2 and several Fokker types, with Fokker to be a consultant for seven years. Airspeed considered making the Fokker D.XVII fighter for Greece, which wanted to buy from Britain for currency reasons. Shute and a Fokker representative "who was well accustomed to methods of business in the Balkans", spent three weeks in Athens but did not close the deal. Shute recommended reading his novel Ruined City to find out what Balkan methods of business were. After a year, the drift to war, and their Air Ministry contracts, meant that the Dutch could not go to the Airspeed factory or board meetings.

Wolseley engine
The project was abandoned in September 1936 after the expenditure of about two hundred thousand pounds when Lord Nuffield got the fixed price I.T.P. (Intention to Proceed) contract papers (which would have required re-orientation of their offices with an army of chartered accountants) and decided to deal only with the War Office and the Admiralty, not the Air Ministry.

According to Nevil Shute Norway it was a very advanced engine (and the price struck Shute as low; much lower than competing engines on the basis of power-to-weight ratio), so its loss was a major disaster for Airspeed (and Britain). But when he asked Lord Nuffield to retain the engine, Nuffield said "I tell you, Norway ... I sent that I.T.P. thing back to them, and I told them they could put it where the monkey put the nuts!" Shute wrote that the loss of the Wolseley engine due to the over-cautious high civil servants of the Air Ministry was a great loss to Britain. Shute said that "admitting Air Ministry methods of doing business ... would be like introducing a maggot into an apple .. Better to stick to selling motor vehicles for cash to the War Office and the Admiralty who retained the normal methods of buying and selling."

Second World War

In June, 1940, formal announcement was made that the de Havilland Aircraft Co., Ltd., had completed negotiations for the purchase from Swan, Hunter and Wigham Richardson, Ltd., of that firm's holding of Airspeed ordinary shares. Airspeed retained its identity as a separate company though as a wholly owned subsidiary of de Havilland.

Around 1943, presumably to reduce the risk of Luftwaffe bombing, a new dispersed design office was opened at Fairmile Manor in Cobham, Surrey; little is known of this establishment and nothing survives there today.

Airspeed's most productive period was during the Second World War. The graceful, twin-engined trainer-cum-light transport aircraft known as the AS.10 Oxford had a production run exceeding 8,500.

3,800 AS51 and AS58 Horsa military gliders were built for the Royal Air Force and its allies. Many of these made one-way journeys into occupied France as part of the D-Day landings, and later the Netherlands for the Arnhem landing, towed from England behind aircraft such as the Douglas Dakota and Handley Page Halifax.

Postwar operations

 
The company reverted to the company name of Airspeed Limited on 25 January 1944. Postwar it converted over 150 surplus ex-RAF Oxford aircraft as AS65 Consuls for the commercial market. Airspeed went on to produce the superbly streamlined pressurised twin-engined piston airliner called the AS57 Ambassador. This served successfully for some years with British European Airways as their "Elizabethan Class". In 1951 Airspeed Limited was fully merged with de Havilland who then cancelled further development of the Ambassador, although the Ambassador fleet continued in service with smaller airlines such as Dan-Air until 1971. 
The original York factory was demolished in November 2015.

Aircraft

AS.1 Tern – (1931)
Glider (sailplane); built to get publicity by breaking British gliding records (Two built; plus parts for third, which were sold)
AS.4 Ferry – (5 April 1932) 
Three-engine biplane transport aircraft, four built
AS.5 Courier – (1 April 1933)
Single-engine low-wing monoplane passenger transport with retractable undercarriage of conventional configuration, 16 built
AS.6 Envoy – (26 June 1934)
Two-engine development of the Courier, 60 built
AS.8 Viceroy – (August 1934)
Variant of Envoy, adapted for long-range flight. One aircraft was built
AS.10 Oxford – (19 June 1937)
Larger two-engine development of Envoy, built in large numbers in the Second World War.
AS.16
Projected licence production of Fokker F.XXII, none built.
AS.20
Projected licence production of Fokker F.XXXVI, none built.
AS.22
Projected licence production of Fokker C.X, none built.
AS.30 Queen Wasp – (11 June 1937)
Single-engine single-seat biplane target drone aircraft
AS.39 Fleet Shadower – (18 October 1940)
Four-engine high-wing monoplane maritime patrol aircraft prototype. Two aircraft were ordered; one was completed
AS.45 Cambridge – (19 February 1941)
Single-engine two-seater low-wing monoplane trainer aircraft with retractable undercarriage of conventional configuration. Two aircraft were built

AS.51 Horsa I – (12 September 1941)
Large troop-carrying glider
AS.57 Ambassador – (10 July 1947)
Two-engine high-wing piston engine airliner, 23 built
AS.58 Horsa II –
Variant of Horsa with openable nose section for front loading
AS.65 Consul – (March 1946)
Civilian conversion of wartime Oxford. Over 150 were converted in 1946-48.

References

Further reading

External links

 Airspeed Type Designations at Flight archive

Defunct aircraft manufacturers of the United Kingdom
Manufacturing companies of England
Defunct companies based in Yorkshire
Companies based in York
British companies established in 1931
Manufacturing companies established in 1931
Manufacturing companies disestablished in 1951
1931 establishments in England
1951 disestablishments in England
British companies disestablished in 1951